This is a list of Indian reservations and Indian colonies in the U.S. state of Nevada.

List of Reservations and Colonies

See also
Indigenous peoples of the Great Basin
List of federally recognized tribes in Nevada
List of Indian reservations in the United States

References

Reservations
Native American-related lists